Sirius Comics, also known as New Sirius Productions and Prelude Graphics, was a small comic book publisher based in Queens, New York, that operated from 1985 to 1986. Owned and operated by brothers Juan (Editor-in-Chief), Leopaldo (President), and Jose Collado (Operating Director), the company specialized in fantasy comics and science fiction comics. 

The company started out in Long Island City and later moved to Woodside. 

Much of the material published by the company was packaged by David Campiti's Creative Concepts via Campiti & Associates. Notable creators connected with Sirius/New Sirius/Prelude Graphics include Campiti, Mark Beachum, Rick Bryant, Bo Hampton, Mark Martin, Bill Oakley, and Roger McKenzie.

Sirius published a house organ called Sirius Comics Solicitations (also called Sirius Solicitations and Sirius Comics/Prelude Graphics Solicitations) that ran at least nine issues through June 1986.

Juan Collado later went on to become president of Dynamite Entertainment.

Titles published

Sirius Comics 
 Against Blackshard: 3-D - The Saga of Sketch, the Royal Artist (1 issue, 1986)
 Greylore (5 issues, Dec 1985Aug 1986)
 Hero Alliance (2 issues, 19851986) — collected and published as the "graphic novel" Hero Alliance: The End of the Golden Age by Pied Piper Comics, another publisher affiliated with David Campiti
 Shifter
 Tales of the Sun Runners (2 issues, Jul 1986Sep 1986) — title continues with Amazing
 Terraformers — ended up being published by Wonder Color, another publisher affiliated with David Campiti

New Sirius Productions 
 Gnatrat: The Dark Gnat Returns (1 issue, 1986) — Mark Martin's parody of Frank Miller's The Dark Knight Returns
 The Survivors (2 issues, Oct 1986Nov 1986)

Prelude Graphics 
 Alternate Heroes (1 issue, Dec 1986)

References

Citations

Sources 

1985 establishments in New York (state)
American companies established in 1985
Defunct comics and manga publishing companies
Publishing companies based in New York City
Publishing companies established in 1985
Publishing companies disestablished in 1986